Marek Taclík (born 9 May 1973 in Ústí nad Labem) is a Czech actor. He starred in the film Operace Silver A under director Jiří Strach in 2007.

Selected filmography
 One Hand Can't Clap (2003)
 Grandhotel (2006)
 Operace Silver A (2007)
 In the Shadow (2012)
 Lost in Munich (2015)
 ''Shadow Country (2020)

References

External links
 

1973 births
Living people
People from Ústí nad Labem
Czech male film actors
Czech male stage actors
Czech male television actors
Czech male voice actors
20th-century Czech male actors
21st-century Czech male actors
Academy of Performing Arts in Prague alumni